Out Goin' Cattin' is the third studio album by American country music band Sawyer Brown, released in 1986. Its title track, along with "Savin' the Honey for the Honeymoon" and "Gypsies on Parade", were all released as singles.

Track listing

Personnel 
Sawyer Brown
 Mark Miller – lead vocals 
 Gregg Hubbard – keyboards, backing vocals 
 Bobby Randall – guitars, backing vocals 
 Jim Scholten – bass 
 Joe Smyth – drums, percussion 

Additional musicians
 John Barlow Jarvis – acoustic piano 
 Shane Keister – synthesizers 
 Gary Prim – keyboards 
 Gene Sisk – keyboards
 Bill LaBounty – guitars 
 Randy Scruggs – guitars 
 Dennis Wilson – guitars 
 Bob Wray – bass
 Jerry Kroon – drums 
 Quitman Dennis – saxophones
 Jim Horn – saxophones 
 Wayne Jackson – trombone, trumpet 
 Mike Haynes – trumpet 
 Cat Joe Bonsall – vocals (4)

Production 
 Randy Scruggs – producer 
 Gene Eichelberger – engineer, remixing 
 Ron "Snake" Reynolds – engineer 
 Glenn Meadows – mastering at Masterfonics (Nashville, Tennessee)
 Roy Kohara – art direction 
 Mark Shoolrey – design 
 Dennis Keeley – photography, tinting

Chart performance

External links
[ Out Goin' Cattin'] at Allmusic

1986 albums
Capitol Records albums
Sawyer Brown albums